Suffer the Little Children may refer to:
 Suffer the Little Children (novel), a novel by Donna Leon
 Suffer the Little Children, a short story by Stephen King
 The Little Children, a saying of Jesus
 Suffer the Little Children (Deadwood episode), an episode of Deadwood
 Suffer The Little Children, a book by Mary Raftery and Eoin O'Sullivan
 Suffer Little Children, a song by The Smiths
 Suffer Little Children, a Sister Fidelma Mystery by Peter Tremayne